Anna Dawson (born 27 July 1937) is an English actress and singer.

Born in Bolton, Lancashire, Dawson spent part of her childhood in Tanganyika, where her father worked. She attended the Elmhurst Ballet School and after training at the Central School of Speech and Drama she learned her craft by playing in repertory theatre companies.

Dawson went on to star in several West End musicals. She featured in episodes of Dixon of Dock Green during the 1960s, The Benny Hill Show during the 1980s, and played Hyacinth Bucket's sister Violet ("the one with the Mercedes, sauna and room for a pony") in the final series of the sitcom Keeping Up Appearances, though her character was only featured on screen briefly in four episodes.

Dawson is married to former Black and White Minstrel Show soloist John Boulter.

TV credits

Filmography

References

English television actresses
English women comedians
Actors from Bolton
1937 births
Living people
People educated at the Elmhurst School for Dance